Tom Price is a mining town in the Pilbara region of Western Australia.  It is located inland, at the edge of the Hamersley Range. Tom Price is the highest town above sea level in Western Australia, and is consequently dubbed "Top Town in WA".

Overview 
Primarily an iron ore mining town, the Mount Tom Price mine (situated approximately  out of town) is under the control of mining giant Rio Tinto. Due to the mid-2000s and late-2010s resource booms in Western Australia, Tom Price is one of the more affluent non-metropolitan regions in Australia, with the average Rio Tinto employee's wage being significantly higher than the Australian average. Tom Price had a population of 3005 at the 2016 census, and its median age of 31 reflected Tom Price's relatively young family-oriented community. 

Tom Price is the closest town to Karijini National Park and is serviced by the nearby Paraburdoo Airport.

Origin of the name of the town 
Tom Price (both the town, the mine and the mountain) was named after Thomas Moore Price, the vice-president of the giant United States steel company Kaiser Steel. Price was one of the main initiators and supporters of the opening up of the Pilbara region to iron ore mining.

Recreational activities 
Tom Price is a very sports-oriented community, partly due to the young population and the lack of other facilities within the town. Tom Price has a range of recreational activities including motocross, speedway, BMX, and many sporting facilities including an Olympic-sized pool, well-equipped gym, tennis, squash, netball, volleyball, golf and basketball courts and three ovals used for football, softball and soccer.

The Fortescue National Football League organises Australian rules football in Tom Price and the nearby town of Paraburdoo.

The town also boasts an unusually high level of artists. Artists in Tom Price often focus on painting and photography, such works often focus on landscapes or linked with Aboriginal heritage.

Attractions 
Being situated in the Pilbara, Tom Price is in a close proximity to many popular attractions, including Karijini National Park, Millstream, Wittenoom and Mount Nameless/Jarndunmunha.

Tourist season usually goes from May through to October. This is due to the heat of the Australian Summer, and the irregular cyclones from October to April.

Schools 
 North Tom Price Primary School
 Tom Price Primary School
 Tom Price Senior High School

Due to its isolation and small population many parents choose to send their children away to boarding schools to further their secondary education, particularly university-bound students, as Tom Price Senior High lacks the student numbers to fulfil the required class numbers set by the Department of Education and Training for many Tertiary Entrance Examination (TEE) subjects. Some TEE subjects are available through distance education (SIDE).

Many students further their studies in areas linked to the mines such as through automotive and trade subjects, often linking into apprenticeships.

Gallery

See also 
 Red Dog Story

Notes

External links 

 Sydney Morning Herald Travel - Tom Price

Hamersley Range
Mining towns in Western Australia
Shire of Ashburton